Mosteirô is a former civil parish in the municipality of Santa Maria da Feira, Portugal. In 2013, the parish merged into the new parish São Miguel do Souto e Mosteirô. It has a population of 2,043 inhabitants and a total area of 2.95 km2.

Sites of interests

Traces of an ancient road near Mosteirô

References

Former parishes of Santa Maria da Feira